Never Say Never is the tenth studio album by Kim Wilde and was released in September 2006. It was a comeback album after being away from the music business for a number of years and her first studio album for eleven years. The album features several of Wilde's hits that have been updated with modern dance beats, interspersed with eight new songs.

Overview 
The album was co-produced by Uwe Fahrenkrog-Petersen, a former member of German band, Nena and Wilde's brother and long-time collaborator Ricky.

After a comparatively long period of negotiations, Kim Wilde finally signed a new record deal with the German division of EMI in late 2005. In July 2006, it was confirmed that a new album, entitled Never Say Never, would be released in Germany on 8 September 2006. The album has since been released in Germany, Austria, Italy, Belgium, Netherlands, Denmark, Sweden, Finland, France, Spain, Portugal, Switzerland, Poland, South Africa, Turkey and Japan.

A single, a re-working of Wilde's 1988 hit "You Came", preceded the album and became her biggest European hit in years. Wilde had announced the sound of the album would be strongly reminiscent of her earlier work. The 14-track album featured eight new songs and six new versions of earlier hits, including "You Keep Me Hangin' On" as a duet with Nena and "Kids in America", as a duet with Charlotte Hatherley. "Cambodia" appears as a bonus track in a remix by Paul Oakenfold.

The second single was "Perfect Girl", released in November 2006 and voted by fans through a poll on Wilde's official website. "Perfect Girl" spent 9 weeks in the German singles Top 100, reaching No. 52. It was also released in Belgium, Switzerland and (as a download only) the Netherlands. A third single, "Together We Belong", was released in March 2007, while a fourth, "Baby Obey Me", was released in August 2007 in two versions: the original album version and a remix featuring German rap artist Ill Inspecta.

The album was a moderate success, reaching the Top 20 in several European countries. It has sold more than 70.000 copies in Europe.

Track listing

Charts

References

2006 albums
Kim Wilde albums
EMI Records albums